Eudesme is a genus of brown algae belonging to the family Chordariaceae.

The genus was first described by Jakob Georg Agardh in 1882.

The genus has cosmopolitan distribution.

Species:
 Eudesme virescens (Carm. ex Berk.) J.Agardh

References

Chordariaceae
Brown algae genera